Mylonas is a Greek and Cypriot Greek family name with the etymological meaning "miller." The genitive case form Mylona (Μυλωνά) is also used for female name-bearers.
Notable people with this surname include:
 Eleni Mylonas (born 1944), Greek-born American artist
 George E. Mylonas (1898–1988), Greek archaeologist
 Georgios Mylonas (1919–1998), Greek politician
 Harris Mylonas (born 1978), Greek-born American political scientist
 Konstantinos Mylonas (born 1916), Greek former sports shooter

References 

Greek-language surnames
Surnames
Occupational surnames